The Security Commission, sometimes known as the Standing Security Commission, was a UK non-departmental public body or quango established in 1964 to investigate breaches of security in the public sector.  It was abolished in 2010, on the basis that government would investigate breaches of security as and when they occurred.

Origins
The idea of the Security Commission, initially canvassed by the Prime Minister Harold Macmillan, was first publicly suggested by his successor Sir Alec Douglas-Home in a Parliamentary debate about the Denning Report into the Profumo affair on 16 December 1963. Douglas-Home envisaged that the commission would consist of retired civil servants and would be chaired by someone from the judiciary. It was to investigate matters referred to it by the Prime Minister of the day and issue its reports back to the Prime Minister, with the Leader of the Opposition consulted before any inquiry and after the report was completed. Douglas-Home met with the Leader of the Opposition Harold Wilson (who had given a cautious welcome to the proposal) on 22 January to agree the details.

Formation
On 23 January 1964 the formation of the Security Commission was announced, with the terms of reference:

Harold Wilson expanded the remit on 10 May 1965 to allow the Commission to investigate circumstances where a breach of security might have occurred.

Reports
The Security Commission issued fifteen reports during its existence.

Members
Latterly its members were:

The Rt Hon Lady Justice Butler-Sloss, DBE (Chairman) 
The Rt Hon Lord Justice Mantell (Alternative chairman) 
Lieutenant General Sir John Foley, KCB OBE MC 
Sir Clive Whitmore, GCB CVO 
Sir Iain Vallance 
Sir John Goulden, GCMG

External links
The Security Commission website (UK Government web archive)

References

1964 establishments in the United Kingdom
2010 disestablishments in the United Kingdom
Cabinet Office (United Kingdom)
Defunct public bodies of the United Kingdom
Government agencies established in 1964
Government agencies disestablished in 2010